Krewe of King Arthur is a coed New Orleans Mardi Gras krewe.

History and formation 
The Krewe of King Arthur was formed in 1977 by the youngest Carnival captain in history, Philip Fricano, Jr. It was the first Westbank men's organization to parade at night in 1979.

In 2001,  King Arthur moved its parade from the Westbank to the current Uptown New Orleans route.

In 2022,  King Arthur made history with its largest membership ever, at over 2,400 riders.  According to Mardi Gras Guide, it is the third largest krewe in New Orleans and the largest Krewe on the first weekend of Mardi Gras

Parade

Parade themes 
{{columns-list|colwidth=30em|
2023 Are you smarter than a Knight grader?
2022 On the Road Again
2021 Looking in A RearView Mirror
2020 20 Years in Downtown New Orleans
2019 And the Arthur Goes To...
2018 New Orleans - Beginning to Present
2017 Right Back Where We Started
2016 King Arthur's Classified Information
2015 It's in the Mail
2014 King Arthur has the Blues
2013 King Arthur Colors his Kingdom
2012 40th Anniversary "Right Back Where We Started" Tribute to Monty Python and the Holy Grail
2011 Floating Down the Nile
2010 What A Long Strange Trip it’s Been
2009 "MedEVIL Times Enquirer"
2008 New Orleans Loves a Parade
2007 King Arthur Celebrates 30 Years
2006 Katrina Blows You Away
2005 Arthur's Ancient Atlas
2004 The Unforgettable Nursery Rhymes of Mother Goose
2003 Louisiana Purchase Bicentennial
2002 King Arthur’s 25th Anniversary, Silver Memories of Purple, Green, and Gold
2001 Toto, I have a Feeling We are not on the Westbank Anymore, We Must be Over the River
1999 And You Thought We Were Dead
1998 
1997 King Arthur Turns Twenty
1996
1995
1994
1993
1992 King Arthur Turns 15 and That's Music To My Ears
1991
1990
1989 Arthur's Avenue of Historical Adventures
1988 King Arthur’s Royal Pastimes
1987 King Arthur’s 10th Year Reunion
1986 A Night in Arthur's Enchanted Forest
1985 Journey into A Foreign Land
1984 Merlin’s Festivals of Entertainment
1983 Halls of Memories - A Tribute to Loyola University
1982 Tour America on the 4th St. Express
1981 Western World Adventures
1980 Saturday Morning Matinee
1979 King Arthur’s Command Performance
1978 It’s A Graduates Dream

Royal court 
The Krewe of King Arthur presents a King Arthur and Queen Guinevere annually.It also includes Merlin the Magician, Morganna Ley Fay, Sir Lancelot, Sir Dagonet

Throws
Trinkets, collectables, masks, and beads tossed by hand from riders of the floats are called throws. Throws from Krewe of King Arthur include wizard hats, puzzles, plush footballs, frisbees, headbands, stuffed animals, and selfie sticks.

Krewe of King Arthur is known for its signature hand-decorated grails. It also gives away the Grail of Grails, a one-off,  specially commissioned decorated  chalice, described by The Advocate as "possibly the most collectable of all throws."

References 

Mardi Gras in New Orleans
Arthurian legend